Aiduzawl is a village in the Khawzawl district of Mizoram, India. It is located in the Khawzawl R.D. Block.

Demographics 

According to the 2011 census of India, Aiduzawl has 61 households. The effective literacy rate (i.e. the literacy rate of population excluding children aged 6 and below) is 96.97%.

References 

Khawzawl district